Ernest Muttitt (24 July 1908 – 8 August 1996) was an English professional footballer who played in the Football League for Brentford and Middlesbrough. He was posthumously inducted into the Brentford Hall of Fame in 2015. A utility player, Muttitt was nicknamed "Bulldog".

Club career

Middlesbrough 
An outside left, Muttitt began his career in his native north east with Northern League club South Bank, before transferring to newly promoted First Division club Middlesbrough in April 1929. Muttitt had to wait until 27 November 1929 to make his debut and scored the winner in a 2–1 victory over Arsenal. He managed 14 appearances and three goals during the 1929–30 season as Middlesbrough consolidated their position with a mid-table finish. Muttitt found first team chances harder to come by in the following two seasons and departed Ayresome Park at the end of the 1931–32 season. Muttitt made 25 appearances and scored four goals during his three years with Middlesbrough.

Brentford 
During the 1932 off-season, Muttitt joined Third Division South club Brentford as part of a four-way transfer, with former Middlesbrough teammates Jack Holliday, Billy Scott and Herbert Watson all arriving at Griffin Park. Muttitt made 14 appearances and scored four goals during his first season with the Bees, a season in which the club finished as Third Division South champions. Muttitt broke into the team during the 1933–34 season, making 40 appearances and scoring 12 goals as Brentford finished fourth in the club's first season in the second tier. 1934–35 was a mixed season for Muttitt, making only 14 appearances, but scoring seven goals and winning a Second Division championship medal. He spent much of the season in the reserve team and contributed to the team's London Challenge Cup triumph.

With Brentford now in the First Division for the first time in the club's history, Muttitt spent long periods out of the team, making just 13 appearances between August 1935 and May 1937 and then spending nearly two years in the reserve team. He returned to first team action in February 1939 and made 13 appearances in what remained of the 1938–39 season. The outbreak of the Second World War in 1939 and the suspension of competitive football brought Muttitt's professional career to a halt, but he remained with Brentford throughout the war, making 100 further appearances and guesting for eight different teams. He was used as a Utility player during this period and was deployed in forward and defensive roles. Muttitt remained with the Bees until 1947 and left Griffin Park after having made 94 competitive appearances and scored 25 goals for the club.

Colchester United (loan) 
Muttitt joined Southern League club Colchester United on loan towards the end of the 1945–46 season, linking up with former Brentford teammate Roddy Munro. Muttitt made one appearance, in a 5–2 victory over Guildford City.

Later years 
Muttitt signed for Kent League First Division club Dover in 1947, who were managed at the time by his former Brentford teammate George Poyser. He ended his career with a spell at Southern League club Dartford.

Personal life 
Muttitt was married with two children. In 1942, Muttitt moved into a house on Braemar Road (opposite Brentford's Griffin Park ground) and in later years was a regular spectator at matches. He was a member of the Special Police Force during the Second World War. In March 2018, Muttitt's son Robert and his family were chosen by Brentford to break ground at the Brentford Community Stadium.

Honours
Brentford
 Football League Second Division: 1933–34
 Football League Third Division South: 1932–33
 London Challenge Cup: 1934–35

Individual
Brentford Hall of Fame

Career statistics

References

1908 births
1996 deaths
Footballers from Middlesbrough
English footballers
Association football outside forwards
South Bank F.C. players
Middlesbrough F.C. players
Brentford F.C. players
West Ham United F.C. wartime guest players
Colchester United F.C. players
English Football League players
Dover F.C. players
Dartford F.C. players
Southern Football League players
Association football inside forwards
Association football defenders
Northern Football League players
Association football utility players
Chelsea F.C. wartime guest players
Charlton Athletic F.C. wartime guest players
Millwall F.C. wartime guest players
Crystal Palace F.C. wartime guest players
Aldershot F.C. wartime guest players
Queens Park Rangers F.C. wartime guest players
Southend United F.C. wartime guest players
Brighton & Hove Albion F.C. wartime guest players
Reading F.C. wartime guest players
Watford F.C. wartime guest players
Fulham F.C. wartime guest players
Kent Football League (1894–1959) players